Robert Donald Sivertson (June 17, 1925 – September 13, 2016) was an American politician in the state of South Dakota. He was a member of the South Dakota House of Representatives from 1971 to 1976. He served in the United States Marine Corps and worked as a firefighter.

References

2016 deaths
1925 births
Politicians from Sioux Falls, South Dakota
Democratic Party members of the South Dakota House of Representatives
United States Marines